Crucicaryum is a genus of flowering plants belonging to the family Boraginaceae.

Its native range is New Guinea.

Species:
 Crucicaryum papuanum O.Brand

References

Boraginaceae
Boraginaceae genera